Tirimüjgan Kadın (16 October 1819 - 3 October 1852; , darting eyelashes) was a consort of Sultan Abdulmejid I, and the mother of Sultan Abdul Hamid II of the Ottoman Empire.

Early life
Tirimüjgan was of Shapsug Circassian ancestry. Her father was named Bekhan Bey and her mother Almaş Hanım. In her memoirs, her granddaughter Ayşe Sultan says that, despite her well-documented origins, Abdul Hamid's enemies falsely claimed that she was the daughter of an Armenian musician named Çandır. According to Charles White, who visited Istanbul in 1843, Tirimüjgan was purchased by Rıza Pasha, and given to Esma Sultan, who educated her, and then presented her to Abdulmejid. She probably worked as a palace servant before becoming a consort. Her granddaughter Ayşe depicted her as having "green eyes and long, light brown hair, pale skin of translucent white colour, thin waist, slender body structure, and very good-looking hands and feet.". Temperamentally, she was known for her refined and gentle manner. In addition, she dabbled in poetry, although she was not particularly talented.

Marriage
Tirimüjgan married Abdulmejid in 1840. She was given the title of "Third Kadın". She was known for her refinement, her politeness, and her beauty. Charles White said the following about her: 

Tirimüjgan gave birth to two princes and one princess. On 11 October 1840, she gave birth to her first child, a daughter Naime Sultan, she died of smallpox at the age of two and a half on 1 May 1843. On 21 September 1842, she gave birth to her second child, a son Şehzade Abdul Hamid (later Abdul Hamid II) On
22 April 1848, she gave birth to her third child Şehzade Mehmed Abid, who died fifteen days later on 7 May 1848. Abdul Hamid named one of his daughters, Naime Sultan and one of his sons, Şehzade Mehmed Abid after these siblings of his.

Having lost a daughter, Tirimüjgan devoted herself to her son, Abdul Hamid, and during her illness, she did everything she could to ensure his happiness. He would go every day to Beylerbeyi Palace to see her, then return to Dolmabahçe Palace.

Nergisnihal Hanım was one of the closest servants of Tirimüjgan. She had appointed her to the service of her infant daughter Naime, and after Naime's death to the service of Abdul Hamid. Before Tirimüjgan died she imparted to Nergisnihal "I entrust my son to you, Do not abandon him, so long as you live, sleep outside of his room. After her death, she did the same as Tirimüjgan bequeathed her, and never left Abdul Hamid. She died in 1892. After Tirimüjgan Kadın's death, Abdülmecid entrusted their son Abdülhamid to another his consort, Rahime Perestu Kadin, who had no children of her own.

Death
Tirimüjgan died on 3 October 1852 in the Feriye Palace, and was buried in the mausoleum of new ladies in New Mosque, Istanbul. Having died before her son ascended the throne, she was never Valide Sultan. Among all her fellow consorts, she felt the closest to Perestu Kadın and always held her in high regard. After her death, Abdul Hamid was adopted by Perestu, who had also been the adoptive mother of Cemile Sultan.

Issue

In literature
Tirimüjgan is a character in Hıfzı Topuz's historical novel Abdülmecit: İmparatorluk Çökerken Sarayda 22 Yıl: Roman (2009).

See also
 Kadın (title)
 List of consorts of the Ottoman Sultans
 List of mothers of the Ottoman sultans
 Ottoman Imperial Harem

References

Sources
 
 
 
 

1852 deaths
19th-century people from the Ottoman Empire
Slaves from the Ottoman Empire
Abdul Hamid II
Consorts of Abdulmejid I
Mothers of Ottoman sultans